Diana Mihaela Petrescu-Popescu (born 27 March 1990) is a Romanian handballer who plays as a goalkeeper for Corona Brașov.

References

 

1990 births
Living people
Sportspeople from Slatina, Romania
Romanian female handball players